The 1991 South Australian Soccer Federation season was the 85th season of soccer in South Australia.

1991 SASF Division One

The 1991 South Australian Division One season was the top level domestic association football competition in South Australia for 1991. It was contested by 12 teams in a 22 round league format, each team playing all of their opponents twice.

League table

1991 SASF Division Two

The 1991 South Australian Division Two season was the second level domestic association football competition in South Australia for 1991. It was contested by 10 teams in a 18 round league format, each team playing all of their opponents twice.

League table

References

1991 in Australian soccer
Football South Australia seasons